

The High Point Shell Midden (Smithsonian trinomial: 35CU215) is a prehistoric archeological site located in Samuel H. Boardman State Scenic Corridor near Carpenterville, Oregon, United States. The midden is located on a strategic high point overlooking the Pacific coast, and is visible in the eroding cliff face. Radiocarbon dating indicates that the site was occupied  CE and again  CE, but additional dating may extend this chronology. Although shell deposits are evident without excavation, it is likely that evidence of other activities related to site occupation may be found on the periphery of the midden. The site has potential to produce scientific data related to several topics, including "site formation processes, landscape evolution, and changes in settlement, subsistence, technology, and society among the Native American cultures of the Oregon Coast."

The High Point Shell Midden was listed on the National Register of Historic Places in 2001.

See also
National Register of Historic Places listings in Curry County, Oregon

Notes

References

External links
, National Register of Historic Places cover documentation
Oregon Historic Sites Database entry

National Register of Historic Places in Curry County, Oregon
Native American Archeological Sites of the Oregon Coast MPS